A blue moon is an additional full moon that appears in a subdivision of a year: the third of four full moons in a season.

The phrase in modern usage has nothing to do with the actual color of the Moon, although a visually blue Moon (the Moon appearing with a bluish tinge) may occur under certain atmospheric conditions—for instance, if volcanic eruptions or fires release particles in the atmosphere of just the right size to preferentially scatter red light.

Definition 

The term has traditionally, in the Maine Farmer's Almanac, referred to an "extra" full moon, where a year which usually has 12 full moons has 13 instead. The "blue moon" reference is applied to the third full moon in a season with four full moons, thus correcting the timing of the last month of a season that would have otherwise been expected too early. This happens every two to three years (seven times in the Metonic cycle of 19 years). The author of a March 1946 article in Sky & Telescope attempted to decipher the traditional practice of the editors of the Maine Farmers' Almanac by examining old issues of the almanac. Without enough almanacs to see the correct pattern, he conjectured the wrong rule for 'blue moons', which led to the modern colloquial misunderstanding that a blue moon is a second full moon in a single solar calendar month, with no link to the order it occurs in a season. The phrase "once in a blue moon" is also used idiomatically, which means once after a long time. An example in a sentence: "My sister lives in Alaska, so I only see her once in a blue moon."

Owing to the rarity of a blue moon, the term "blue moon" is used colloquially to mean a rare event, as in the phrase "once in a blue moon".

One lunation (an average lunar cycle) is 29.53 days. There are about 365.24 days in a tropical year. Therefore, about 12.37 lunations (365.24 days divided by 29.53 days) occur in a tropical year. In the widely used Gregorian calendar, there are 12 months (the word month is derived from moon) in a year, and normally there is one full moon each month, with the date of the full moon falling back by nearly one day every calendar month. Each calendar year contains roughly 11 days more than the number of days in 12 lunar cycles. The extra days accumulate, so every two or three years (seven times in the 19 year Metonic cycle), there is an extra full moon in the year. The extra full moon necessarily falls in one of the four seasons, giving that season four full moons instead of the usual three, and, hence, a "blue" moon.

 In calculating the dates for Lent and Easter, Catholic clergy identified a "Lenten moon". Historically, when the moons arrived too early, they called the early moon a "betrayer" (belewe) moon, so the Lenten moon came at its expected time.
 Folklore named each of the 12 full moons in a year according to its time of year. The occasional 13th full moon that came too early for its season was called a "blue moon", so the rest of the moons that year retained their customary seasonal names.
 The Maine Farmers' Almanac called the third full moon in a season that had four the "blue moon".
 The frequency of a blue moon can be calculated as follows: It is the period of time it would take for an extra synodic orbit of the moon to occur in a year. Given that a year is approximately 365.2425 days and a synodic orbit is 29.5309 days, then there are about 12.368 synodic months in a year. For this to add up to another full month would take 1/0.368 years. Thus it would take about 2.716 years, or 2 years, 8 months, and 18 days for another blue moon to occur.
 Using the common 1946 Sky & Telescope misunderstanding, when one calendar month has two full moons; the second one is called a "blue moon". On rare occasions in a calendar year (as happened in 2010 in time zones east of UTC+07, and in 2018 in almost every time zone) both January and March each have two full moons, so that the second one in each month is called a "blue moon", and the month of February, with only 28 or 29 days, has no full moon. Under this misinterpretation, certain tropical years with 13 full moons, which would normally be said to have one blue moon, can be said to have two blue moons, making blue moons appear to be more frequent.

Etymology

The earliest recorded English usage of the term blue moon is found in an anti-clerical pamphlet (attacking the Roman clergy, and Cardinal Thomas Wolsey in particular) by two converted Greenwich friars, William Roy and Jerome Barlow, published in 1528 under the title Rede me and be not wrothe, for I say no thynge but trothe.
The relevant passage reads:

It is not clear from the context that this refers to intercalation; the context of the passage is a dialogue between two priest's servants, spoken by the character "Jeffrey" (a brefe dialoge betwene two preste's servauntis, named Watkyn and Ieffraye). The intention may simply be that Jeffrey makes an absurd statement, "the moon is blue", to make the point that priests require laymen to believe in statements even if they are patently false.

"Betrayer moon" speculation 
In 2007, Joe Rao, Skywatching Columnist at Space.com, stated that many years previously he had speculated in Natural History magazine that the "Blue Moon Rule" might derive from belewe, which he described as an Old English word meaning 'to betray', because the extra full moon "betrays the usual perception of one full moon per month." He then added that his speculation had been "innovative", but "completely wrong". In 2009, a less detailed version of this speculation was mentioned in Farmers' Almanac.

Maine Farmers' Almanac blue moons
In the 19th and early 20th centuries, the Maine Farmers' Almanac listed blue moon dates for farmers. These correspond to the third full moon in a quarter of the year when there were four full moons (normally a quarter year has three full moons). Full moon names were given to each lunation in a season. The seasons used were those of the mean tropical year, equal in length, as opposed to the astronomical seasons which vary in length because the earth's speed in its orbit round the sun is not uniform.

To compare, in 1983 the equal seasons began at 1.48 AM on 23 March, 9.15 AM on 22 June, 4.42 PM on 21 September and 12.10 AM on 22 December, while the astronomical seasons began at 4.39 AM on 21 March, 11.09 PM on 21 June, 2.42 PM on 23 September and 10.30 AM on 22 December (all times GMT). When a season has four full moons the third is called the "blue moon" so that the last can continue to be called with the proper name for that season.

Sky and Telescope calendar misinterpretation
The March 1946 Sky and Telescope article "Once in a Blue Moon" by James Hugh Pruett misinterpreted the 1937 Maine Farmers' Almanac. "Seven times in 19 years there were—and still are—13 full moons in a year. This gives 11 months with one full moon each and one with two. This second in a month, so I interpret it, was called Blue Moon." Widespread adoption of the definition of a "blue moon" as the second full moon in a month followed its use on the popular radio program StarDate on January 31, 1980 and in a question in the Trivial Pursuit game in 1986.

Whole blue moon 

The most literal meaning of blue moon is when the moon (not necessarily a full moon) appears to a casual observer to be unusually bluish, which is a rare event. The effect can be caused by smoke or dust particles in the atmosphere, as has happened after forest fires in Sweden and Canada in 1950 and 1951, and after the eruption of Krakatoa in 1883, which caused the moon to appear blue for nearly two years. Other less potent volcanoes have also turned the moon blue. People saw blue moons in 1983 after the eruption of the El Chichón volcano in Mexico, and there are reports of blue moons caused by Mount St. Helens in 1980 and Mount Pinatubo in 1991. In the Antarctic diary of Robert Falcon Scott for July 11, 1911 his entry says, "... the air thick with snow, and the moon a vague blue".

On September 23, 1950, several muskeg fires that had been smoldering for several years in Alberta, Canada, suddenly blew up into major—and very smoky—fires. Winds carried the smoke eastward and southward with unusual speed, and the conditions of the fire produced large quantities of oily droplets of just the right size (about 1micrometre in diameter) to scatter red and yellow light. Wherever the smoke cleared enough so that the sun was visible, it was lavender or blue. Ontario, Canada, and much of the east coast of the United States were affected by the following day, and two days later, observers in Britain reported an indigo sun in smoke-dimmed skies, followed by an equally blue moon that evening.

The key to a blue moon is having many particles slightly wider than the wavelength of red light (0.7 micrometer)—and no other sizes present. It is rare, but volcanoes sometimes produce such clouds, as do forest fires. Ash and dust clouds thrown into the atmosphere by fires and storms usually contain a mixture of particles with a wide range of sizes, with most smaller than 1 micrometer, and they tend to scatter blue light. This kind of cloud makes the moon turn red; thus red moons are far more common than blue moons.

Blue moons between 2009 and 2037
The following blue moons occur between 2009 and 2021. These dates use UTC as the time zone; exact dates vary with different time zones.

Seasonal

Using the Maine Farmers' Almanac definition of blue moon (meaning the third full moon in a season of four full moons, but referenced to astronomical rather than equal seasons), blue moons have occurred on:
 November 21, 2010
 August 20, 2013
 May 21, 2016
 May 18, 2019
 Aug 22, 2021

Calendar

Unlike the astronomical seasonal definition, these dates are dependent on the Gregorian calendar and time zones. These blue moons cannot occur in February.

Two full moons in one month (the second of which is a "blue moon"):
A blue moon can occur in January and the following March if there is no full moon at all in February, as is the case in the years 1999, 2018, and 2037.
 2009: December 2 and 31 (partial lunar eclipse visible in some parts of the world), only in time zones west of UTC+05
 2010: January 1 (partial lunar eclipse) and 30, only in time zones east of UTC+04:30
 2010: March 1 and 30, only in time zones east of and including UTC+07
 2012: August 2 and 31, only in time zones west of and including UTC+10
 2012: September 1 and 30, only in time zones east of and including UTC+10:30
 2015: July 2 and 31
 2018: January 2 and 31 (total lunar eclipse visible in some parts of the world), only in time zones west of and including UTC+11
 2018: March 2 and 31, only in time zones west of and including UTC+12
 2020: October 1 and 31, only in time zones west of and including UTC+10
 2020: November 1 and 30 (penumbral lunar eclipse visible in some parts of the world), only in time zones east of and including UTC+9
 2028: December 2 and 31 (total lunar eclipse visible in some parts of the world), only in time zones west of UTC+8
 2029: January 1 (total lunar eclipse) and 30, only in time zones east of UTC+7
 2037: January 1 and 31 (total lunar eclipse visible in some parts of the world), plus March 2 and 31

The next time New Year's Eve falls on a Blue Moon (as occurred on December 31, 2009 in time zones west of UTC+05) is after one Metonic cycle, in 2028 in time zones west of UTC+08. At that time there will be a total lunar eclipse.

See also

 Black moon
 Blood moon
 Wet moon

References

External links
 Once in a blue moon meaning and origin by The Idioms Dictionary
 Information about the August 2012 Blue Moon
 "Folklore of the Blue Moon" by Philip Hiscock
 "What's a Blue Moon?" by Donald W. Olson, Richard T. Fienberg, and Roger W. Sinnott, Sky & Telescope.  Article explaining that originally a blue moon meant the 3rd full moon in a season of 4 full moons, and how the "2nd in a month" error began.

Calendars
Moon myths
Full moon